Colonel Benjamin Alvin Drew (born November 5, 1962) is a United States Air Force officer and a former NASA astronaut. He has been on two spaceflights; the first was the Space Shuttle mission STS-118 to the International Space Station, in August 2007. Drew's second spaceflight took place in March 2011 on STS-133, another mission to the International Space Station. STS-133 was Space Shuttle Discovery's final mission. Drew took part in two spacewalks while docked to the station. Drew was the final African-American to fly on board a Space Shuttle, as the final two Space Shuttle missions, STS-134 and STS-135, had no African-American crew members.

Drew was selected to be an astronaut in NASA's Astronaut Group 18 in July 2000. Following his rookie spaceflight, Drew spent almost a year at the Yuri Gagarin Cosmonauts Training Center in Star City, Russia, overseeing NASA's training operations there as director of operations.

On February 28, 2011, Drew became the 200th person to walk in space, when he conducted the first spacewalk of the STS-133 mission with fellow astronaut Steve Bowen.

Early life
Drew was born in 1962 in Washington, D.C., and spent his early years in Lanham, Maryland. He moved to Brookland, Washington, D.C., when he was four years old. Drew recalls having a desire to be a pilot from as early as four years old. In October 1968, at the age of five, Drew saw the Apollo 7 launch on television, and thereafter reputedly wished to become an astronaut.

After graduating from St. Anthony Catholic School in 1977 for his elementary education, he graduated from Gonzaga College High School in Washington, D.C. Drew was named a National Merit Scholar and went on to earn a dual B.S. degree in physics and astronautical engineering from the United States Air Force Academy in 1984, and a M.S. degree in aerospace science from Embry-Riddle Aeronautical University. He then earned a Master's degree in political science from the Air War College.

Military career
Drew received his commission as a second lieutenant from the United States Air Force Academy in May 1984. He completed Undergraduate Helicopter Pilot Training at Fort Rucker, Alabama, in 1985. His initial assignment was to the HH-3E, flying combat rescue missions. He later transitioned to the MH-60G and was assigned to the Air Force Special Operations Command. There, he flew combat missions in operations Just Cause, Desert Shield, Desert Storm and Provide Comfort.  He completed USAF Fixed-Wing Qualification in 1993, and the United States Naval Test Pilot School in June 1994. He has commanded two flight test units and served on Air Combat Command staff.

Drew is a command pilot with over 3,000 hours flying time, flown in over 30 types of aircraft. He retired from the air force in September 2010, after more than 25 years of service.

NASA career
Selected as a mission specialist by NASA in July 2000, Drew reported for training in August 2000. Following the completion of two years of training and evaluation, he was assigned technical duties in the Astronaut Office Station Operations Branch. He served in technical assignments until he took a sabbatical to the U.S. Air Force's Air University at Maxwell Air Force Base, Alabama, attending a master's degree program at their Air War College.

After his first successful spaceflight, STS-118, he worked as CAPCOM officer in Mission Control for the Mission of STS-123. Drew then spent almost a year in Russia as the director of operations overseeing the US operations at Yuri Gagarin Cosmonauts Training Center in Star City. On April 21, 2009, he delivered a lecture “Space Shuttle Flight-118: A Mission to Build the International Space Station” at the ELE public forum in Moscow.

STS-118

When Clayton Anderson was moved to STS-117 Drew was selected for the available position on STS-118.

STS-133

Drew served as a mission specialist on STS-133, the final flight of the Space Shuttle Discovery. This mission launched on February 24, 2011, and docked with the space station two days later. Landing occurred on March 9.  Drew's role on this crew was that of a mission specialist, and he conducted two spacewalks.  On February 28, Drew became the 200th person to walk in space.

Awards and honors
Drew's decorations include the Meritorious Service Medal with 1 Oak Leaf Cluster; Air Medal; Aerial Achievement Medal with 5 Oak Leaf Clusters; Air Force Commendation Medal with 2 Oak Leaf Clusters; Air Force Achievement Medal; Air Force Outstanding Unit Award with 3 Oak Leaf Clusters; Combat Readiness Medal with 5 Oak Leaf Clusters; National Defense Service Medal; Armed Forces Expeditionary Medal; and the Southwest Asia Service Medal with 3 service stars.

Patti Grace Smith Fellowship 
In October 2020, Drew co-founded the Patti Grace Smith Fellowship, a branch of the Brooke Owens Fellowship intended to provide resources for African-American undergraduate students pursuing careers in aerospace.

Gallery

See also

List of African-American astronauts

References

External links
 
Spacefacts biography of B. Alvin Drew

United States Air Force officers
United States Air Force Academy alumni
1962 births
Living people
People from Washington, D.C.
Embry–Riddle Aeronautical University alumni
Recipients of the Air Medal
Gonzaga College High School alumni
United States Air Force astronauts
NASA civilian astronauts
Space Shuttle program astronauts
Spacewalkers